Field of View III ~Now Here No Where~ is the third studio album by Japanese group Field of View. The album was released on September 30, 1998 by Zain Records. The album reached #13 on the Oricon chart for first week with 32,790 sold copies. It charted for 4 weeks and sold 49,940 copies.

Track listing

Usage in media
Kawaita Sakebi was used as the opening theme for the 1998 anime adaptation of Yu-Gi-Oh!
Meguru Kisetsu wo Koete was used as the ending theme for the Fuji TV program Unbelievable.
Kimi wo Terasu Taiyou Ni was used as the ending theme for the Tokyo Broadcasting System Television program "Uwasa no! Tokyo Magazine".

Cover
Miho Komatsu covered "Kawaita Sakebi" on her 6th studio album Hanano.

References 

1998 albums
Being Inc. albums
Japanese-language albums
Field of View albums